The 1991 Japanese motorcycle Grand Prix was the first round of the 1991 Grand Prix motorcycle racing season. It took place on the weekend of 22–24 March 1991 at the Suzuka Circuit.

Noboru Ueda, who won the 125cc race on his Grand Prix motorcycle racing debut, would become the last rider to win on his debut until Can Öncü in 2018.

500 cc classification

250 cc classification

125 cc classification

References

Japanese motorcycle Grand Prix
Japanese
Motorcycle